Torstein Eriksen (born 29 April 1990) is a rallying co-driver from Norway. He is currently teamed with Andreas Mikkelsen and is competing for Toksport WRT in the World Rally Championship-2.

Rally career

Torstein Eriksen began his rally career in 2009, co-driving for Frank Tore Larsen. In 2011 Rally Finland, he made his WRC debut but retired from the rally due to mechanical issue.

In the 2017 Rally Finland and 2017 Rally Catalunya, he partnered Mads Østberg and scored his first WRC points in Finland, where they finished tenth.

In 2018, the Norwegian crew were signed by Citroën for selected events. In the 2018 Rally Finland, Eriksen achieved his first WRC podium where he finished second overall in a Citroën C3 WRC.

Results

WRC results

* Season still in progress.

References

External links

 Torstein Eriksen's e-wrc profile

1990 births
Norwegian rally co-drivers
Living people
World Rally Championship co-drivers